VOKO-Irodion is a volleyball club from Oosterhout.

VOKO was founded in 1974 as an agreement between former Oosterhout volleyball clubs LEC and RELAX.
The first team plays in the Dutch third division, and their goal is promote to the national divisions.

External links
 

Dutch volleyball clubs
Sports clubs in North Brabant
Volleyball clubs established in 1974
1974 establishments in the Netherlands
Sport in Oosterhout